Dermomurex angustus is a species of sea snail, a marine gastropod mollusk in the family Muricidae, the murex snails or rock snails.

Description
The shell grows to a length of  13 mm.

Distribution
This marine species occurs along South and West Australia.

References

 Merle D., Garrigues B. & Pointier J.-P. (2011) Fossil and Recent Muricidae of the world. Part Muricinae. Hackenheim: Conchbooks. 648 pp.

Gastropods described in 1895
Dermomurex